Ovčiarsko Tunnel is a highway tunnel under construction in northern Slovakia near Žilina, on the D1 highway. The tunnel is planned to be 2,367 m long in the south and 2,360 m in the north. An exploration gallery was driven from 1996 to 1998. Originally, the tunnel was planned to be built with all southern Žilina's bypass between 2010 and 2014 as a PPP project. But the new Iveta Radičova's executive cancelled it in 2010 and made a decision to be financed by EU funds and the state budget. The construction started in July 2014 and the north tube was pierced in April 2016. Perforation of the south tube is planned in July 2016. The general contractor of this tunnel is Uranpres.

The opening date of the tunnel was planned for September 2018.

References

External links
 Ovciarsko Tunnel

Road tunnels in Slovakia
Proposed road tunnels in Europe